Sealioning (also sea-lioning and sea lioning) is a type of trolling or harassment that consists of pursuing people with relentless requests for evidence, often tangential or previously addressed, while maintaining a pretense of civility and sincerity ("I'm just trying to have a debate"), and feigning ignorance of the subject matter. It may take the form of "incessant, bad-faith invitations to engage in debate", and has been likened to a  denial-of-service attack targeted at human beings.  The term originated with a 2014 strip of the webcomic Wondermark by David Malki, which The Independent called, "the most apt description of Twitter you'll ever see".

Description 
The sealioner feigns ignorance and politeness while making relentless demands for answers and evidence (while often ignoring or sidestepping any evidence the target has already presented), under the guise of "I'm just trying to have a debate", so that when the target is eventually provoked into an angry response, the sealioner can act as the aggrieved party, and the target presented as closed-minded and unreasonable. It has been described as "incessant, bad-faith invitations to engage in debate".  Sealioning can be performed by an individual or by a group acting in concert.

An essay in the collection Perspectives on Harmful Speech Online, published by the Berkman Klein Center for Internet & Society at Harvard, noted:

American academic philosopher Walter Sinnott-Armstrong discussed the term in his book Think Again: How to Reason and Argue, saying:

Several other academics link or directly describe sealioning as a technique employed by internet trolls.

In December 2020, the Merriam-Webster Online Dictionary listed the term as "Words We're Watching", being "words we are increasingly seeing in use but that have not yet met our criteria for entry":

In 2021, Canadian magazine Maclean's praised the Merriam-Webster definition saying "This neologism on Merriam-Webster’s list of words to watch aptly describes the frustration of conversing online".

Comparisons
The technique of sealioning has been compared to the Gish gallop and metaphorically described as a denial-of-service attack targeted at human beings (i.e. overloading a target with questions).

In 2022, English philosopher and academic Sophie Grace Chappell likened sealioning to the Socratic term eirôneia (from which the word irony is derived but with a different end meaning), which she described as an insincere pretense of ignorance as a way to disassemble an argument, saying "In contemporary internet slang, eironeia is «sealioning»."

Origins and history 

Use of the term originates from a 2014 strip of the webcomic Wondermark by David Malki, where a character expresses a dislike of sea lions and a sea lion intrudes to repeatedly ask her to explain her statement and attempts (in an exaggeratedly civil manner) to interrogate her views, following the characters into the privacy of their own home. "Sea lion" was quickly verbed. The term gained popularity as a way to describe a specific type of online trolling, and it was used to describe some of the behavior of those participating in the Gamergate controversy.

In 2014, Dina Rickman of the online version of The Independent said of Malki's strip, "This comic is the most apt description of Twitter you'll ever see".

In a 2016 study published in First Monday focusing on users of the Gamergate subreddit /r/KotakuInAction, participants were surveyed about what they believed constituted "harassment". Participants were quoted stating that "expressions of sincere disagreement" were considered harassment by opponents of the forum and that the term "Sealioning" was used to silence legitimate requests for proof.

In 2021, Maclean's compared its origination to other terms derived from comic strips that became common speech such as Brainiac (1958 comic book) and Milquetoast (from the 1924 comic strip). Maclean's noted that Malki had mixed feelings about the term, quoting him as saying: "I didn't set out to coin a phrase. I just wanted to make an observation", and "The core of what I set out to criticize is just the notion that any random patient stranger should feel entitled to as much of someone’s attention as they want".

See also 
 Argumentum ad nauseam — a more general term for an argument that has continued past the point of value
 Griefer

References

External links

 "The Terrible Sea Lion", the Wondermark comic strip that inspired the term
 Wondermark Errata defending the cartoon against accusations of classism and speciesism
 Sea-Lioning, at Know Your Meme

2014 neologisms
Internet culture
Internet trolling